The surname Quinones is of Spanish language origin. In Spanish, it is spelled Quiñones. 

Sam Quinones is an American journalist from Los Angeles, California. He is best known for his reporting in Mexico and on Mexicans in the United States, and for his chronicling of the opioid crisis in America through his 2015 book Dreamland, followed by, in 2021, his book, The Least of Us. He has been a reporter for 35 years. He is now a freelance journalist. Prior to that he was a reporter for the Los Angeles Times from 2004 to 2014.

Early life and education
Quinones grew up in Claremont, California. He graduated from Claremont High School in 1977 and then attended the University of California at Berkeley, graduating with B.A. degrees in Economics and American History.

Career

Journalism
He took his first journalism job in 1987 at the Orange County Register. The next year he moved to Stockton, California, where he spent four years working as a crime reporter for the Stockton Record. In 1992, he moved to Seattle, where he covered county government and politics for the Tacoma News-Tribune.

He left for Mexico in 1994 where he worked as a freelance reporter. Quinones returned to the United States in 2004 to work for the Los Angeles Times, covering immigration-related stories and gangs.

He wrote in November 2012 about efforts to rework the Mexican indigenous governance system known as usos y costumbres (uses and customs), which has become seen as disadvantaging migrants to the United States and pitting them against people who had remained in their villages.

In 2013, he took a leave of absence from the paper to work on his book Dreamland about the opioid epidemic in America, focusing on abuse of prescription painkillers such as Oxycontin and the spread of Mexican black-tar heroin, primarily by men from the town of Xalisco, Nayarit.

Dreamland was selected as one of the Best Books of 2015 by Amazon.com, the Daily Beast, Buzzfeed, Seattle Times, Boston Globe, St. Louis Post-Dispatch, Entertainment Weekly, Audible, and in the Wall Street Journal and Bloomberg Business by Nobel economics laureate, Prof. Angus Deaton, of Princeton University. 
 
In 2014, Quinones left the Los Angeles Times to "return to freelancing, writing for National Geographic, Pacific Standard Magazine, the New York Times, the Los Angeles Magazine, and several other publications."

In January 2017, Quinones was interviewed by Sally Wiggin from WTAE Pittsburgh. The two discussed his book Dreamland and the opioid epidemic Pennsylvania and other states are facing in the 21st century.

Writing for the Los Angeles Times in January 2017, Quinones penned an op-ed piece titled, "The Truth is Immigrants have let us live like Princes." In the article, he writes about the positive economic impact of immigrant workers on the Southern Californian region of the United States.

Books
 True Tales from Another Mexico: The Lynch Mob, the Popsicle Kings, Chalino and the Bronx (University of New Mexico Press, 2001) is a collection of non-fiction stories of Mexico on the margins and a country in transition. Among the stories are tales of a colony of drag queens as they prepare for Mexico's oldest gay beauty contest; the Michoacan village where everyone has made a life making popsicles; the bare-knuckle neighborhood of Tepito; the story of Aristeo Prado, the last valiente of his wild and violent rancho in Michoacan; the story of Jesus Malverde, the narcosaint of Sinaloa; Oaxacan Indian basketball players holding onto tradition in Los Angeles; the story of a lynching in a small Hidalgo town; and the only biography ever written of Chalino Sanchez, the immigrant narcosinger gunned down after a show, who became a legend and probably the most influential musical figure to come out of Los Angeles in a generation.
 Antonio's Gun and Delfino's Dream: True Tales of Mexican Migration (University of New Mexico Press, 2007), is a collection of non-fiction stories about Mexican immigrants, and their lives on both sides of the border, based on his reporting in Mexico. Stories include the Henry Ford of Velvet Painting in El Paso/Juarez; how a rich and vital opera scene emerged in the babbling border city of Tijuana; the season of a high school soccer team in Garden City, Kansas; and finally, how drug-trafficking Mennonites in Chihuahua ran Quinones out of Mexico. Threading through the book are the stories of a young construction worker named Delfino Juarez, who first hitched his future to Mexico City then, when it failed him, he moved north to Los Angeles.
 Dreamland: The True Tale of America's Opiate Epidemic (Bloomsbury Press, 2015) is story of the evolving opioid epidemic in Mexico and the United States. Quinones describes the "explosion in heroin use and how one small Mexican town changed how heroin was produced and sold in America."
The Virgin of the American Dream: Guadalupe on the Walls of Los Angeles, Quinones first book of photojournalism, documents murals of the Virgin of Guadalupe on walls and buildings in Los Angeles. The murals are used to dissuade "tagging" of walls throughout Mexico.
The Least of Us: True Tales of America and Hope in the Time of Fentanyl and Meth (Bloomsbury Publishing, 2021) is a follow-up to Dreamland which covers synthetic drugs like fentanyl and meth as well as "unnoticed stories of Americans involved in community repair".

Other professional activities
In 1998, he was selected as a recipient of the Alicia Patterson Fellowship, for a series of stories on impunity in Mexican villages. In 2008, he was awarded a Maria Moors Cabot prize, by Columbia University, for a career of excellence in covering Latin America.

In 2011, he started a storytelling experiment, called "Tell Your True Tale" on his website. The site aims to encourage new writers to write their own stories. At last count it had more than 50 stories posted.

In February 2012, Quinones started "True Tales: A Reporter's Blog" about “Los Angeles, Mexico, migrants, culture, drugs, neighborhoods, border, and good storytelling.”

His book Dreamland: The True Tale of America's Opiate Epidemic was released in hardback in 2015, and a year later in paperback. It won a National Book Critics Circle award for the Best Nonfiction Book of 2015. It was also selected as one of the Best Books of 2015 by Amazon.com, the Daily Beast, Buzzfeed, Seattle Times, Boston Globe, St. Louis Post-Dispatch, Entertainment Weekly, Audible, and in the Wall Street Journal and Bloomberg Business by Nobel economics laureate, Prof. Angus Deaton, of Princeton University.

Following the release of Dreamland in April of 2015, Quinones gave 265 speeches about the book and the opioid epidemic over the next four and a half years to small towns, universities, professional conferences of judges, narcotics officers, doctors, public health and social workers, addiction counselors, and many more. 

In 2019, Dreamland was selected as one of the Best 10 True-Crime Books of all time based on lists, surveys, and ratings of more than 90 million Goodread.com readers. Also in 2019, Slate.com selected Dreamland as one of the 50 best nonfiction books of the last 25 years. In 2021, GQ Magazine selected Dreamland as one of the “50 Best Books of Literary Journalism of the 21st Century.”

In The Least of Us (published October 2021), Quinones chronicles the emergence of a drug-trafficking world producing massive supplies of dope cheaper and deadlier than ever, marketing to the population of addicts created by the nation's opioid epidemic, as the backdrop to tales of Americans’ quiet attempts to recover community through simple acts of helping the vulnerable. In 2022, the National Book Critics Circle nominated The Least of Us as one of the best nonfiction books of 2021.

Quinones has lectured a more than 50 universities across the United States. He testified before the U.S. Senate Labor, Education, Health and Pensions committee in January, 2018. In 2012, he gave a lecture at the University of Arizona entitled “So Far from Mexico City, So Close to God: Stories of Mexican Immigrants" and of Mexico's Escape from History.”

Personal life
Quinones lives in Southern California.

Awards and honors
2015 National Book Critics Circle Award (Nonfiction) winner for Dreamland: The True Tale of America's Opiate Epidemic

References

External links
Official website
2017 Interview with WATE Television in Pittsburgh, PA
Quinones on Twitter
Sam Quinone's blog

American male journalists
Living people
University of California, Berkeley alumni
Los Angeles Times people
People from Claremont, California
1958 births